Coplay is a borough in Lehigh County, Pennsylvania. Coplay's population was 3,348 at the 2020 census. It is located six miles (10 km) northwest of Allentown. The borough is part of the Lehigh Valley metropolitan area, which had a population of 861,899 and was the 68th most populous metropolitan area in the U.S. as of the 2020 census.

Geography
Coplay is located at  (40.670521, -75.495395).

History

For a long time it was known as Schreibers. Later it was known as the Lehigh Valley, because of the Lehigh Valley Iron Furnaces that were located here. Lehigh Valley was then changed to Coplay, derived from "Kolapechka", the son of the Indian chief Paxanosa, who lived at the head of the creek near Schnecksville. The Borough of Coplay seceded from Whitehall Township in 1869 and was incorporated as a borough on April 7, 1869.

Coplay gradually changed from a farming area into an industrial community. The Thomas Iron Company started the change. They brought in workers and built homes for them. When the Iron Company was liquidated, other industries gradually came to Coplay, including the Cement Mill, the Silk Mill, the Cigar Factory, and Knitting Mill. Coplay became a melting pot of many nationalities. The Pennsylvania Dutch and Germans were initially drawn to agriculture. The growth of the iron industry attracted immigrants from Ireland. Then, in the early 1900s, the Cement Mills attracted immigrants from Austria, Hungary, Czechoslovakia, Poland, and the Ukraine.

On April 7, 1969, the borough celebrated its centennial anniversary. A celebration was held from June 15–21 in the town. The Coplay Cement Company Kilns was added to the National Register of Historic Places in 1980.

Demographics

As of the census of 2000, there were 3,387 people, 1,431 households, and 953 families residing in the borough. The population density was 5,373.1 people per square mile (2,075.8/km²). There were 1,484 housing units at an average density of 2,354.2 per square mile (909.5/km²). The racial makeup of the borough was 96.84% White, 1.56% African American, 0.09% Native American, 0.32% Asian, 0.53% from other races, and 0.65% from two or more races. Hispanic or Latino of any race were 2.27% of the population. Coplay has one of the highest reported rates of Austrian ancestry in the United States, at 10.6%.

There were 1,431 households, out of which 28.8% had children under the age of 18 living with them, 49.3% were married couples living together, 13.5% had a female householder with no husband present, and 33.4% were non-families. 29.3% of all households were made up of individuals, and 14.4% had someone living alone who was 65 years of age or older. The average household size was 2.34 and the average family size was 2.90.

In the borough, the population was spread out, with 23.0% under the age of 18, 5.3% from 18 to 24, 29.9% from 25 to 44, 20.9% from 45 to 64, and 20.9% who were 65 years of age or older. The median age was 40 years. For every 100 females there were 86.2 males. For every 100 females age 18 and over, there were 83.3 males. The median income for a household in the borough was $38,679, and the median income for a family was $46,278. Males had a median income of $31,519 versus $24,983 for females. The per capita income for the borough was $18,580. About 5.6% of families and 7.0% of the population were below the poverty line, including 13.8% of those under age 18 and 5.3% of those age 65 or over.

Education
The Borough of Coplay is served by the Whitehall-Coplay School District. Coplay students in grades nine through 12 attend Whitehall High School.

Transportation

No numbered highways serve Coplay directly. Main thoroughfares through the borough include Second Street and Chestnut Street.

Notable person
Saquon Barkley, professional football running back, New York Giants

References

External links

Official borough website

1799 establishments in Pennsylvania
Boroughs in Lehigh County, Pennsylvania
Boroughs in Pennsylvania
Populated places established in 1799